The Australian cricket team toured Sri Lanka from 10 August to 13 September 1992 to play three Test matches, three One Day Internationals (ODIs).

This was a historical test series for Sri Lanka as this was the first home series for Sri Lanka after 1987. One of the highlights of the series was the emergence of Shane Warne. Another highlight was wicket keeping batsman Romesh Kaluwitharane scoring his maiden test ton on debut at SSC.

The first test at SSC turned out to be a famous test match as Sri Lanka collapsed for 164 in pursuit of 180. Especially where Sri Lanka was comfortably led by 291 runs in the first innings.

Australian captain Allan Border said after this match that the result achieved by his team must be the ‘greatest heist since the Great Train Robbery’.

Squads

Test series

1st Test

2nd Test

3rd Test

ODI series

1st ODI

2nd ODI

3rd ODI

Records and statistics

Batting

Bowling

References

External links
 ESPNcricinfo

1992 in Australian cricket
1992 in Sri Lankan cricket
1992
International cricket competitions from 1991–92 to 1994
Sri Lankan cricket seasons from 1972–73 to 1999–2000